Tõnu Virve (18 June 1946 Rõuge – 1 October 2019 Tallinn) was an Estonian theatre and film designer and artist, producer and director.

In 1974 he graduated from the Estonian State Art Institute in theatre decoration speciality. 1975–1980 he was the principal artist at Estonian Youth Theatre. 1980–1990 he was an artist-director at Tallinnfilm. In 1990 he established the independent film studio Freyja Film (ERSFF).

Filmography

 1979: "Hukkunud Alpinisti hotell" (stage artist)
 1980: "Metskannikesed" (stage artist, costume artist)
 1991: "Surmatants" (director, scenarist, producer)

References

1946 births
2019 deaths
20th-century Estonian male artists
21st-century Estonian male artists
Estonian film directors
Estonian film producers
Estonian Academy of Arts alumni
People from Rõuge Parish